The Swift Aircraft Swift is a single engine, conventional light aircraft, seating two in side-by-side configuration.  It is being developed in the UK but has yet to fly.

Design and development

The Swift is mostly built from composite materials; flying surfaces and the fuselage are formed from composite sandwiches and the wing and tailplane have carbon fibre spars. It has a low wing of trapezoidal plan with slightly upturned tips, fitted with Frise ailerons and slotted flaps. The rear surfaces are also trapezoidal.  There is a trim tab in the elevator and a ground adjustable tab on the rudder.

The cockpit has a fixed windscreen and rearward-sliding canopy and is equipped with dual controls. There is a baggage space behind the side-by-side seats.  The Swift has a fixed, tricycle undercarriage with the mainwheels on fuselage mounted, spring steel, cantilever legs. The mainwheels have disc brakes and the nosewheel is steerable.  The Swift is designed to accept a range of Textron Lycoming horizontally opposed engines in the power range 119-194 kW (160-260 hp), driving a three-bladed propeller.

The Swift program was announced in May 2009. In 2015 Swift Technology Group announced a "multi million pound investment" supporting development of the aircraft and other products, and exhibited a static display at AeroExpo UK.

Variants
Swift II Intended to be type certified to EASA CS-23
Swift VLA Intended to be certified to EASA CS-VLA in kit and factory-complete flyaway versions

Specifications (Swift II)

References

External links
 Swift Aircraft

Proposed aircraft of the United Kingdom